DYOD (106.3 FM), broadcasting as 106.3 DABIG C Radio, is a radio station owned and operated by Prime Broadcasting Network. Its studios and transmitter are located at the 3rd Floor, PDCI Bldg., Rizal St., Ormoc.

References

External links
Prime FM Ormoc FB Page

Radio stations in Leyte (province)
Radio stations established in 2017